Beate Bischler (born 17 June 1968) is a retired German Paralympic judoka who competed in international level events. She was a bronze medalist at the 2004 Summer Paralympics after defeating Nina Ivanova in the bronze medal match.

References

1968 births
Living people
People from Villingen-Schwenningen
Sportspeople from Freiburg (region)
Paralympic judoka of Germany
Judoka at the 2004 Summer Paralympics
Medalists at the 2004 Summer Paralympics
German female judoka
20th-century German women
21st-century German women